Alan McHugh is a Scottish actor, comedian and writer.  He is best known for his roles in television shows such as Taggart (as Assistant Chief Constable Strathairn), Take the High Road, Limmy's Show, and Rab C. Nesbitt. He co-wrote the jukebox stage musical I Dreamed a Dream about the rise of Scottish singer Susan Boyle alongside fellow comedian Elaine C. Smith.

Career
McHugh has writing credits with I Dreamed a Dream and numerous pantomimes among them. He starred in the Scottish soap opera Take the High Road as local policeman Tony Piacentini. His theatre work includes Aladdin, Jack and the Beanstalk, and Cinderella. As well as writing pantomimes, McHugh also plays characters in them and has become a part of a double act with his friend and fellow actor Jordan Young.

In 2014, he appeared in the stage play Sunset Song as John Guthrie. He has appeared twice before in national tours of the play, starring as Chae Strachan and Long Rob in 2002 and 2008 respectively. McHugh also appeared as the dame in the pantomime run of Beauty and the Beast at His Majesty's Theatre, Aberdeen in late 2014. as well as the dame, Mrs. Smee, in The Pantomime Adventures of Peter Pan at His Majesty's Theatre, Aberdeen.

Filmography
Take the High Road as PC Tony Piacentini
Sea of Souls as Paul Gregory
Still Game as Brian
To Have and To Hold as the comedian
Taggart as ACC David Strathairn
Rab C. Nesbitt as Chief Inspector McQuillan
Limmy's Show as various characters

References

External links
 

Living people
Year of birth missing (living people)
Scottish male television actors
Scottish male stage actors
Scottish male comedians
Scottish dramatists and playwrights
Male actors from Glasgow
Comedians from Glasgow